The 17th Reserve Division is a formation of the Syrian Army responsible for north-eastern Syria. It is one of two autonomous reserve divisions of the Syrian Arab Army, the other being the 18th Armoured Division.

Structure
The Division is an autonomous division Syrian Army's Corps structure, and was composed of 137th Mechanized Brigade, the 93rd Armoured Brigade (KIA), 154th Special Forces Regiment, and the 121st Artillery Regiment (Milbia).

The Division is one of the Syrian Army's 5 Specialised Divisions, which unlike the Army's conventional Divisions include both brigades and maneuver regiments.

History

Role in the civil war

The 17th Reserve Division was active in Deir ez-Zor province throughout 2012.

The division's 93rd Brigade left Idlib to secure Raqqa Governorate in early 2012.

In November 2012 the Free Syrian Army claimed that elements of the 17th Division were in Rastan, thereby raising the possibility that elements of the Division withdrew from the east as the Syrian Government lost positions there.

Following the reported capture of Raqqa on 3–6 March 2013, elements of the 17th Division remained under siege to the north of the city in October 2013.

Following the fall of the Menagh airbase, the remaining troops of the defeated 17th Division sought refuge with Kurdish forces.  The Kurds, however, turned over the senior officers to al-Nusra in exchange for Kurdish prisoners and the Islamists promptly killed the handed over officers, including Colonel Naji Abu Shaar.

In July 2014, ISIL captured the division's and 93rd's Brigade headquarters in the 2014 Eastern Syria offensive.

In February 2016, the 137th Brigade was reported to be controlling airdropped UN aid supplies in Deir ez-Zor city.

On 15 October 2016, the 137th Brigade attacked the southern outskirts of their former HQ that was occupied by ISIS in Deir ez-Zor. They killed several militants and destroyed three armored vehicles.

In June 2017, the Syrian Democratic Forces and other allied forces, aided by US airstrikes, captured the main base/headquarters of the division, located in the outskirts of Raqqa from ISIS after clashes between the two forces occurred as part of the Battle of Raqqa.

Major General Nizzar Khaddour, who hails from Republican Guard, is the current commander of the 17th Reserve Division.

References 

Divisions of Syria
Raqqa Governorate
Military units and formations established in 1970
Infantry divisions